Ice Lake is Intel's codename for the 10th generation Intel Core mobile and 3rd generation Xeon Scalable server processors based on the Sunny Cove microarchitecture. Ice Lake represents an Architecture step in Intel's Process-Architecture-Optimization model. Produced on the second generation of Intel's 10 nm process, 10 nm+, Ice Lake is Intel's second microarchitecture to be manufactured on the 10 nm process, following the limited launch of Cannon Lake in 2018. However, Intel altered their naming scheme in 2020 for the 10 nm process. In this new naming scheme, Ice Lake's manufacturing process is called simply 10 nm, without any appended pluses.

Ice Lake CPUs are sold together with the 14 nm Comet Lake CPUs as Intel's "10th Generation Core" product family. There are no Ice Lake desktop or high-power mobile processors; Comet Lake fulfills this role. Sunny Cove-based Xeon Scalable CPUs (codenamed "Ice Lake-SP") officially launched on April 6, 2021. Intel officially launched Xeon W-3300 series workstation processors on July 29, 2021.

Ice Lake's direct successor in mobile is Tiger Lake, a third-generation 10 nm processor family using the new Willow Cove microarchitecture and integrated graphics based on the new Intel Xe microarchitecture. Ice Lake-SP will be succeeded by Sapphire Rapids, powered by Golden Cove cores. Several mobile Ice Lake CPUs were discontinued on July 7, 2021.

Design history and features
Ice Lake was designed by Intel Israel's processor design team in Haifa, Israel.

Ice Lake is built on the Sunny Cove microarchitecture. Intel released details of Ice Lake during Intel Architecture Day in December 2018, stating that the Sunny Cove core Ice Lake would be focusing on single-thread performance, new instructions, and scalability improvements. Intel stated that the performance improvements would be achieved by making the core "deeper, wider, and smarter".

Ice Lake features Intel's Gen11 graphics, increasing the number of execution units to 64, from 24 or 48 in Gen9.5 graphics, achieving over 1 TFLOPS of compute performance. Each execution unit supports 7 threads, meaning that the design has 512 concurrent pipelines. Feeding these execution units is a 3 megabyte L3 cache, a four-fold increase from Gen9.5, alongside the increased memory bandwidth enabled by LPDDR4X on low-power mobile platforms. Gen11 graphics also introduces tile-based rendering and Coarse Pixel Shading (CPS), Intel's implementation of variable-rate shading (VRS). The architecture also includes an all-new HEVC encoder design. On August 1, 2019, Intel released the specifications of Ice Lake -U and -Y CPUs. The Y-series CPUs lost their -Y suffix and m3 naming. Instead, Intel uses a trailing number before the GPU type to indicate their package power; "0" corresponds to 9W, "5" to 15W, and "8" to 28W. Furthermore, the first two numbers in the model number correspond to the generation of the chip, while the third number dictates the family the CPU belongs to (i3, i5, etc.); thus, a 1035G7 would be a 10th generation Core i5 with a package power of 15 watts and a G7 GPU.

Pre-orders for laptops featuring Ice Lake CPUs started in August 2019, followed by shipments in September.

CPU

 Intel Sunny Cove CPU cores
On average 18% increase in IPC in comparison to 2015 Skylake running at the same frequency and memory configuration
 Dynamic Tuning 2.0 which allows the CPU to stay at turbo frequencies for longer
Hardware acceleration for SHA operations (Secure Hash Algorithms)
 Intel Deep Learning Boost, used for machine learning/artificial intelligence inference acceleration
 PCI Express 4.0 on Ice Lake-SP

GPU
 Gen 11 GPU with up to 64 execution units (From 24 and 48 EU) 
4K at 120 Hz, 5K, 8K display output
 Variable Rate Shading
 DisplayPort 1.4a with Display Stream Compression; HDMI 2.0b
 Up to 1.15 TFLOPS of computational performance
 Two HEVC 10-bit encode pipelines, either two 4K 60Hz RGB/ 4:4:4 streams simultaneously or one 8K 30Hz  4:2:2
 VP9 8-bit and 10-bit hardware encoding for all supported platforms as part of Intel Quick Sync Video
 Integer and nearest neighbor image scaling
4th Gen IPU

Package
 10 nm transistors (originally called 10 nm+ transistors in older naming scheme)
 New memory controller with DDR4 3200 and LPDDR4X 3733 support
 Integrated support for Wi-Fi 6 (802.11ax)
 Thunderbolt 3 support

List of Ice Lake CPUs

Ice Lake (mobile)

Ice Lake-SP (Xeon Scalable)

Xeon Platinum series

Xeon Gold series

Xeon Silver series

Xeon Bronze series 
There are no bronze series processors in Xeon SP Gen3.

Workstation processors 
 "Ice Lake-W3300" (10 nm)
 PCI Express lanes: 64
 Supports up to 16 DIMMs of DDR4 memory, maximum 4 TB.

See also
 List of Intel CPU microarchitectures
10th generation Intel Core
Comet Lake

References

Intel products
Transactional memory
Intel microprocessors